Mercury mirror can mean:
 A glass mirror created by mercury silvering 
 Mercury glass mirror
 A component of liquid-mirror telescopes